Thomas F. Madden (born 10 June 1960) is an American historian, a former Chair of the History Department at Saint Louis University in St. Louis, Missouri, and Director of Saint Louis University's Center for Medieval and Renaissance Studies. A specialist on the Crusades, he has often commented in the popular media after the events of September 11, to discuss topics such as how Muslims have viewed the medieval Crusades and their parallels to today's interventions in the Middle East.
He has frequently appeared in the media, as a consultant for various programs on the History Channel and National Public Radio. In 2007, he was awarded the Haskins Medal from the Medieval Academy of America, for his book Enrico Dandolo and the Rise of Venice, also a "Book of the Month" selection by the BBC History magazine.  In 2012, he was named a Fellow of the John Simon Guggenheim Memorial Foundation. In 2018, he was named a National Endowment for the Humanities Public Scholar.

Biography
Madden received his bachelor's degree from the University of New Mexico in 1986, and his Masters (1990) and PhD (1993) degrees in History from the University of Illinois.

Madden is active in the Society for the Study of the Crusades in the Latin East, and organizes panels for the Annual Symposium on Medieval and Renaissance Studies in Saint Louis, Missouri.  He is the Director of the Crusades Studies Forum and the Medieval Italy Prosopographical Database Project, both housed at Saint Louis University.

Awards
 2005 Otto Grundler Prize, Medieval Institute
 2007 Haskins Medal, Medieval Academy of America, for the book Enrico Dandolo and the Rise of Venice
 2012 Guggenheim Fellowship
 2013 Fellow of the Medieval Academy of America
 2015 American Council of Learned Societies, Fellow
 2018 National Endowment for the Humanities, Public Scholar Award

Writing
Madden has written numerous books and journal articles, including the "Crusades" entry for the Encyclopædia Britannica. His research specialties are ancient and medieval history, including the Fourth Crusade, as well as ancient and medieval Italian history. His 1997 revision of The Fourth Crusade: The Conquest of Constantinople (originally authored by Donald Queller) was a selection of the History Book Club. He is also known for speaking about the ways that the history of the Crusades is often used for manipulation of modern political agendas.  His book, The New Concise History of the Crusades has been translated into seven foreign languages.

His book Enrico Dandolo and the Rise of Venice won multiple awards, including the 2007 Haskins Medal from the Medieval Academy of America and the Otto Gründler Prize from the Medieval Institute. According to the Medieval Review, with this book "Madden more than ever stakes out his place as one of the most important medievalists in America at present."

His 2008 book, Empires of Trust, was a comparative study that sought elements in historic republics that led to the development of empires.  In the case of Rome, he argued that their citizens and leaders acquired a level of trust among allies and potential enemies that was based upon an unusual rejection of hegemonic power.  His most recent book, Venice: A New History is the culmination of decades of work in the archives and libraries of Venice.

Books
 Istanbul: City of Majesty at the Crossroads of the World, 2016 Viking
 Venice: A New History, 2012, Viking
 Crusades: Medieval Worlds in Conflict (Editor), 2010 Ashgate
 Empires of Trust, 2008, Dutton/Penguin
 The Fourth Crusade: Event, Aftermath, and Perceptions, 2008, Ashgate
 Crusades: The Illustrated History, 2005, University of Michigan Press
 Enrico Dandolo and the Rise of Venice, 2003, Johns Hopkins University Press
 The Crusades: The Essential Readings, 2002, Blackwell
 The New Concise History of the Crusades, 1999, Rowman & Littlefield
 Medieval and Renaissance Venice, 1999, University of Illinois Press
 The Fourth Crusade: The Conquest of Constantinople, co-author with Donald Queller, 1997, University of Pennsylvania Press

Select popular articles
 The Islamic State's Members Believe They are Fighting a New Crusade.  They're Wrong.", Washington Post, December 4, 2015.
 "The Pope Joins a Fine but Rarely Seen Tradition", Wall Street Journal, February 14, 2013.
 "The Real History of the Crusades", ARMA, March 19, 2011 (updated 2005 piece) 
 "America's Days Aren't Numbered", The Wall Street Journal, July 4, 2008.
 "Not Dead Yet: The Lost Tomb of Jesus -- One Year Later", NRO, March 21, 2008.
 "Unreasonable Response: Benedict XVI Hasn't Revived the Crusades", NRO, September 18, 2006.
 "Crusaders and Historians", First Things, June/July 2005.
 "Onward P.C. Soldiers: Ridley Scott's Kingdom of Heaven, NRO, May 27, 2005.
 "The Real Inquisition: Investigating the Popular Myth,", NRO, June 18, 2004.
 'Crusade Myths', The Catholic Dossier, January/February 2002.

Select scholarly articles
 "The Venetian Version of the Fourth Crusade: Memory and the Conquest of Constantinople in Medieval Venice," Speculum 87 (2012): 311-44.
 "The Latin Empire of Constantinople’s Fractured Foundation: The Rift Between Boniface of Montferrat and Baldwin of Flanders," in The Fourth Crusade: Event, Aftermath, and Perceptions (Brookfield: Ashgate Publishing, 2008): 45-52.
 "Food and the Fourth Crusade: A New Approach to the 'Diversion Question,'" in Logistics of Warfare in the Age of the Crusades, John H. Pryor, ed. (Brookfield: Ashgate Publishing, 2006): 209-28.
 "Venice, the Papacy, and the Crusades before 1204," in The Medieval Crusade, Susan J. Ridyard, ed. (Woodbridge: Boydell and Brewer, 2004): 85-95.
 "The Enduring Myths of the Fourth Crusade," World History Bulletin 20 (2004): 11-14.
 "The Chrysobull of Alexius I Comnenus to the Venetians: The Date and the Debate," Journal of Medieval History 28 (2002): 23-41.
 "Venice's Hostage Crisis: Diplomatic Efforts to Secure Peace with Byzantium between 1171 and 1184," in Ellen E. Kittell and Thomas F. Madden, eds., Medieval and Renaissance Venice (Urbana: University of Illinois Press, 1999): 96-108.
 "Outside and Inside the Fourth Crusade," The International History Review 17 (1995): 726-43.
 "Venice and Constantinople in 1171 and 1172: Enrico Dandolo’s Attitude towards Byzantium," Mediterranean Historical Review 8 (1993): 166-85.
 "Vows and Contracts in the Fourth Crusade: The Treaty of Zara and the Attack on Constantinople in 1204," The International History Review 15 (1993): 441-68.
 "Father of the Bride: Fathers, Daughters, and Dowries in Late Medieval and Early Renaissance Venice," Renaissance Quarterly 46 (1993): 685-711. (with Donald E. Queller)
 "The Fires of the Fourth Crusade in Constantinople, 1203-1204: A Damage Assessment," Byzantinische Zeitschrift 84/85 (1992): 72-93.
 "The Serpent Column of Delphi in Constantinople: Placement, Purposes, and Mutilations," Byzantine and Modern Greek Studies 16 (1992): 111-45.

Recorded lectures
 "God Wills It!" Understanding the Crusades
 The Decline and Fall of Rome
 From Jesus to Christianity: The History of the Early Church
 Upon This Rock: A History of the Papacy from Peter to John Paul II
 Empire of Gold: A History of the Byzantine Empire
 One, Holy, Catholic, and Apostolic: A History of the Church in the Middle Ages
 Christianity and the Crossroads: The Reformations of the Sixteenth and Seventeenth Centuries
 Heaven or Heresy: A History of the Inquisition
 The Catholic Church in the Modern Age

History Channel documentaries
 Decoding the Past, "Spear of Christ"
 Decoding the Past, "Secrets of the Koran"
 The Big Build, "The Castle Tower"

References

External links
 http://www.thomasmadden.org/
 http://www.tfp.org/TFPForum/western_civilization/madden_interview.htm
 http://www.unm.edu/~market/cgi-bin/archives/000524.html

1960 births
Living people
Writers from Phoenix, Arizona
Saint Louis University faculty
American medievalists
Historians of antiquity
Historians of the Crusades
Fellows of the Medieval Academy of America